The U.S. Committee for Refugees and Immigrants (USCRI) was established "To protect the rights and address the needs of persons in forced or voluntary migration worldwide and support their transition to a dignified life."

History 
The history of the U.S. Committee for Refugees and Immigrants can be traced to two organizations formed during the 1910s: the International Institutes and the Foreign Language Information Service (FLIS). The International Institute movement began in 1911 in New York City as the brainchild of Edith Terry Bremer.  Over the next six years, the movement spread across the nation with offices opening in Massachusetts, California, New Jersey, Connecticut, Pennsylvania, Indiana, Michigan, Missouri and Ohio. By 1924 the number of International Institutes had grown to 55 and reached across the country to Los Angeles.

The origins of the FLIS date to 1918, when the United States Committee on Public Information began an effort to communicate its wartime messages to members of the domestic population who did not speak English. As such, the Committee produced articles about the war effort and sent ready-to-print translations to foreign language newspapers published in the United States. After the war, the FLIS was formed as a private organization that could carry on work in a similar vein. Like its precursor, the FLIS wrote and distributed articles to the foreign language press on topics of interest to immigrant readers. However, the FLIS expanded on this mission by creating articles for the English-language press aimed at educating the general population on immigrant life, culture, and achievements. In 1922 the organization began publishing Interpreter Releases, a weekly immigration law update with 48 issues/year.

In 1924 the National Origins Act, severely restricting the number of immigrants entering the country was passed as well as the Labor Appropriation Act which officially established the Border Patrol.

The FLIS changed its name to the Common Council on American Unity (CCAU) in 1939, and the CCAU and the International Institutes merged in 1959 to become the American Council for Nationalities Service (ACNS). The ACNS, in turn, became Immigration and Refugee Services of America in 1994, and the U.S. Committee for Refugees and Immigrants in 2004.

Activities 
The U.S. Committee for Refugees and Immigrants (USCRI) administers domestic programs related to refugee resettlement and placement, foreign-born victims of human trafficking, and unaccompanied immigrant children. Its international programs focus on defending the rights of refugees and asylum seekers. It is a partnership between USCRI and the American Immigration Lawyers Association. Each child helped by the center is under age 18 and without a parent or resources in the United States. The Center holds pro bono trainings throughout the United States for potential volunteer attorneys.

World Refugee Survey

The World Refugee Survey is an annual USCRI report presenting information on refugees, internally displaced persons and asylum seekers.  The country-by-country analysis is based on information collected from governments, international organizations, nongovernmental organizations and field visits.  Each country profiled in the Survey is given a grade.  Countries are rated according to refugees' enjoyment of rights under the 1951 Convention Relating to the Status of Refugees and are graded on: 1) Refoulement/Physical Protection 2) Freedom of Movement and Residence 3) Detention/Access to Courts 4) Right to Earn a Livelihood and 5) Public Relief and Education.

On June 19, 2008, the U.S. Committee for Refugees and Immigrants and its research partners released the World Refugee Survey 2008 with events around the world.  Within the annual publication, USCRI released a list of the Ten Worst Places for Refugees.  Countries and regions were graded based on their commitment to standards outlined in the 1951 Convention Relating to the Status of Refugees.  As determined by the committee, the 'Ten Worst Places' were: Bangladesh, China, Europe, Iraq, Kenya, Malaysia, Russia, Sudan, and Thailand.  Sixty countries hosting the largest numbers of refugees were profiled in the 2008 survey. In 2009, the 'Worst Places for Refugees' were South Africa, Gaza, Thailand, Kenya, Malaysia, Egypt and Turkey.

On June 20, 2008, Deputy Prime Minister Datuk Seri Najib Tun Razak of Malaysia stated, "Malaysia strongly disagrees with the newly released World Refugee Survey 2008."

References

External links
 Official USCRI Site
United States Committee for Refugees and Immigrants (USCRI) records at the Immigration History Research Center Archives, University of Minnesota Libraries

Refugee aid organizations in the United States